Vertical penetration is a scalar measurement of distance, of the maximum altitude an object, most often an aircraft can gain at any particular moment in time, thereby converting all of its energy from kinetic to gravitational potential.

It is worth noting that when listing an aircraft's technical specifications, vertical penetration can be appropriately used in substitution of maximum vertical penetration.

Calculation
Assume an aircraft has the same mechanical energy at two separate points in its flight - one when the aircraft is straight and level, holding a constant airspeed, and negligible altitude (near zero potential energy) and the other, following a sudden 90 degree pitch increase in attitude, when the aircraft has noticeable altitude, and negligible airspeed (zero kinetic energy). Assuming the aircraft can 100% efficiently convert all of its kinetic energy to potential (theoretically have a radius of 0 in the turn, refer to centripetal force), the aircraft has the same mechanical energy in both points, the kinetic energy of the first point equaling the potential energy of the second:

where m is the mass, v is the speed, h is the height of the body, and g is standard gravity. In SI units (used for most modern scientific work), mass is measured in kilograms, speed in metres per second, height is in metres, standard gravity in Metre per second squared, and the resulting energy is in joules.

Notice that neither mass nor standard gravity were given subscripts indicating which point they correspond to. This is because both are assumed constant. This is mildly incorrect for both. As an aircraft operates, it consumes fuel, oil, etc., which slightly decreases mass. And since the standard gravity is inversely proportional to the distance between the body and Earth, and the aircraft is gaining altitude (increasing said distance), slightly decreasing standard gravity.

Aerodynamics